Li Guowen (24 August 1930 – 24 November 2022) was a Chinese novelist who was the director of China Writers Association. Li was a member of the Chinese Communist Party.

Biography
Li was born in Shanghai, Republic of China in August 1930.

In 1947, he was accepted to Nanjing Academy of Drama and graduated in 1949. 
After graduation, Li went to Beijing and he entered North China University of Technology.

When the Korean War broke out in 1950, Li joined the People's Liberation Army, he went to North Korea and served as a writer in the Chinese People's Liberation Army Naval Song and Dance Troupe, after the war, Li returned to Beijing, he worked in China Railway Federation of Trade Union as an editor.

In July 1957, Li published his short story Re-election (《》) in People's Literature (《》), then he was divided into right winger, and he was sent to a construction plant to work.

In 1978, Li joined the China Railway Song and Dance Troupe. Li joined the China Writers Association in 1982 and he joined the Chinese Communist Party in 1983.

On 24 November 2022, he died of an illness in Beijing, at the age of 92.

Works

Novel
Spring in Winter

Short story
 Re-election
 Lunar Eclipse
 History of the Dangerous Building

Proses and poems
 The Art of Swearing
 Everyday Language

Translated works (English) 
 Spring in Winter: Volume 1
 Spring in Winter: Volume 2

Awards
 Spring in Winter – 1st Mao Dun Literature Prize (1982)
 Lunar Eclipse – 3rd National Excellent Short Story Award
 History of the Dangerous Building – 4th National Excellent Short Story Award
 Everyday Language – 2nd Lu Xun Literature Prize

References

1930 births
2022 deaths
Chinese male short story writers
North China University of Technology alumni
Short story writers from Shanghai
Mao Dun Literature Prize laureates
Chinese male novelists
20th-century Chinese short story writers
20th-century Chinese male writers
People's Republic of China short story writers